Mohammedan Sporting Club or Mohammedan S.C. may refer to the following sports teams:

Mohammedan SC (Kolkata), sports club in Kolkata, India
Mohammedan SC Futsal, futsal club in Kolkata
Mohammedan Sporting Club (Dhaka), sports club in Dhaka, Bangladesh
Mohammedan Sporting Club (Chittagong), sports club in Chittagong, Bangladesh
Mohammedan Sporting Club (Jhenaidah), sports club in Jhenaidah, Bangladesh
Mohammedan Sporting Club cricket team, List A cricket team in Bangladesh